Buffy/Angel crossover books involve characters and places from both TV shows.

Canonical issues

The books featured in this list are not part of Buffyverse canon. They are not considered as official Buffyverse reality, but are novels from the authors' imaginations. However, unlike fanfic, "overviews" summarising their story, written early in the writing process, were "approved" by both Fox and Whedon (or his office), and were therefore later published as official Buffy or Angel merchandise.

External links
Nika Summer's Buffy Library

Books based on Buffy the Vampire Slayer
 
Lists of novels based on works